The 2014 Auburn Tigers football team represented Auburn University in the 2014 NCAA Division I FBS football season. The team was coached by Gus Malzahn, who was in his second season as head coach at Auburn. The Tigers played their home games at Jordan–Hare Stadium in Auburn, Alabama and competed in the Western Division of the Southeastern Conference (SEC). They finished the season 8–5, 4–4 in SEC play to finish in a tie for fourth place in the Western Division. They were invited to the Outback Bowl where they lost to Wisconsin.

Before the season

Previous season
The 2013 Auburn Tigers football team had a big turnaround in Gus Malzahn's inaugural year as head coach, finishing 12–2 after 3–9 campaign in 2012. The season included last-minute victories against Mississippi State and Texas A&M and particularly stunning games against rival Georgia, in the game dubbed the Prayer at Jordan–Hare, as well as against in-state rival Alabama, in the game dubbed The Kick Six.  The win over Alabama earned Auburn a spot in the SEC Championship Game.

The Tigers became Southeastern Conference champions after defeating Missouri in the SEC Championship Game and earned a bid to the BCS National Championship Game against Florida State.  There Auburn lost to Florida State, 34–31, after a late lead-changing touchdown pass by the Seminoles with 13 seconds left in the game. The Tigers finished the season ranked #2 in both the AP and Coaches polls.

Shortly after the season, Heisman Trophy finalist junior running back Tre Mason—who broke Bo Jackson's school record for rushing yards in a single season—as well as redshirt sophomore left tackle Greg Robinson declared their intentions to forgo their remaining eligibility and enter the NFL Draft.

Recruiting class
The Tigers notched their fifth consecutive recruiting class ranked within the top 10 nationally. Five signees enrolled prior to spring practice, while the rest enrolled in the summer.

Spring game
The Tigers spring game 'A-Day' was held on Saturday April 19. The Blue team defeated the White team 58-3 with quarterback Nick Marshall and linebacker Kenny Flowers earning offensive and defensive MVP honors respectively. 70,645 fans attended the game, the second most in school history after the previous year's A-Day, which had 83,401 in attendance.

Fall practice and preseason
Auburn lost starting DE Carl Lawson and reserve defensive end Keymiya Harrell to ACL injuries as well as starting OG Alex Kozan to a back injury. DT Tyler Nero's career is likely over after he collapsed during spring practice. OL Shane Callahan transferred to the University of Colorado, while Auburn added two transfers in former Ole Miss starting OG Austin Golson and former Georgia starting SS Trey Matthews—both will have to sit out the 2014 season per NCAA transfer rules before regaining eligibility for the 2015 season.

Auburn had a league high 13 players make it on the all SEC list. The 1st team players included QB Nick Marshall, WR Sammie Coates, C Reese Dismukes, DT Gabe Wright. The 2nd team players included  TE CJ Uzomah, OG Alex Kozan (out for season) and ST Robenson Therezie. 3rd team selections were RB Cory Grant, OG Chad Slade, DT Montravius Adams, DE Carl Lawson (out for season), LB Cassanova McKinzy and CB Jonathan Mincy.

QB Nick Marshall is a finalist for the Maxwell (Best Player), Davey O'Brien (QB) and Walter Camp Award (QB)
WR Sammie Coates is a finalist for the Maxwell(Best Player) and Blietnekoff Award (WR) and AFCA's Good Works Team (off field award)
TE CJ Uzomah is a finalist for the Mackey Award (TE)
C Reese Dismukes is a finalist for the Rimington Award (C) and Lombardi (top lineman or LB)
LB Kris Frost is a finalist for Butkus Award (LB)
ST Robenson Therezie is a finalist for the Bednarik Award (top defensive player)

Senior starting CB Jonathan Mincy was arrested for 2nd degree marijuana possession and senior starting QB Nick Marshall was cited for possession of a small amount of marijuana (under once ounce) during the off-season. It was both players' first drug-related offenses. Mincy is currently going through a pre-trial diversion after his arrest. Both players did not start for the first game against Arkansas (however they would both see the field later in the game) and served some other undisclosed punishment.

Senior starting ST Robenson Therezie faced an undisclosed eligibility issue during fall camp, however he would be cleared to play just prior to the season opener against Arkansas.

Personnel

Roster and staff

Returning starters

Offense

Defense

Depth chart
As of November 4, 2014

Injured/Suspended

DE Carl Lawson (ACL: Season)
OG Alex Kozan (Back: Season)
OG Jordan Diamond (Shoulder: Season)
WR Stanton Truitt (Shoulder: Season)

Schedule

Schedule Source:

Game summaries

Arkansas

Jeremy Johnson started in place of Nick Marshall, and played until halftime. The defense was steamrolled at the beginning of the game, allowing 21 points in the first half, and the offense in the first half scored 21 points. Nick Marshall, who was suspended for the entire first half for a drug related citation, led Auburn's offense to 24 second half points. Auburn's defense improved greatly in the second half allowing 0 points in that period, forcing several dropped passes to wide open receivers. Auburn won its season debut.

A nearby thunderstorm caused a delay of one hour and 28 minutes in the 4th quarter at 9 minutes, 55 seconds remaining. Auburn now leads the all-time series 13–10–1.

San Jose State

The second game of the season was against the San Jose State Spartans. The Tigers and Spartans had previously never met on the gridiron before. The Tigers now lead the series 1–0–0.

Auburn struggled on defense early, giving up some big plays, most notably a 75-yard touchdown pass from Blake Jurich to Tyler Ervin. On Auburn's first possession Nick Marshall ran 39 yards but lost the ball in the end zone resulting in a touchback.  Auburn only gave up one touchdown and two field goals against the Spartans. Quan Bray had Auburn's first punt return for a touchdown since Chris Davis against Tennessee in 2013. Jermaine Whitehead also became the first Auburn player to record interceptions in back-to-back games since 2007. Roc Thomas got his first carries as an Auburn Tiger late in the game, and his first carry was a touchdown. This was also Cameron Artis-Payne's first multi-touchdown game. Auburn is now 2-0 and 1-0 in SEC play. The 2004 undefeated team was honored during the pregame ceremony.

Kansas State

In a rare Thursday night game, Auburn traveled to Kansas State. Auburn struck first with a field goal after a fumble by Kansas State was recovered by Auburn. Kansas State scored a touchdown in the second quarter. Auburn, however, struck back with a touchdown pass from Nick Marshall to Ricardo Louis. Auburn then scored the next 10 points, all during the fourth quarter. Kansas State then scored a touchdown with less than 5 minutes to go. Then, Auburn's last drive ended up in a 3rd and 9, and Nick Marshall threw the ball to Duke Williams who made an impressive reception to seal the win for Auburn. After this game, the Tigers lead the all-time series 4-0-0.

Louisiana Tech

The fourth game of the season was against the Louisiana Tech Bulldogs. Auburn was up 24–0 late in the second quarter before Louisiana Tech scored a field goal to end the half. There was a time when it was somewhat close early in the third quarter as Auburn only led 24–10. Auburn's offense then started scoring more points, especially Quan Bray who had two touchdowns in the second half and three touchdowns overall including two touchdown receptions and one punt return for a touchdown. Auburn ended up with a great homecoming victory 45-17. Auburn now leads the all-time series 12-0-1.

LSU

Auburn struck first with a 46-yard field goal by Daniel Carlson which was his longest so far this season. The offense then lit up scoring 17 points in the first quarter. The defense only allowed one LSU touchdown, taking advantage of Les Miles's  decision to have true freshman QB Brandon Harris have his 1st career start on the road at night in JHS. In the second quarter, Auburn scored 14 more points and the defense held LSU scoreless in that period. At halftime, the score was Auburn 31, LSU 7. Daniel Carlson got a 42-yard field goal in the third quarter. LSU did not convert a single third down, they were 0–13. Auburn stopped LSU on fourth down three times. It was a big conference win for Auburn. The win improved Auburn's all-time record against LSU to 21–27–1.

Mississippi State

College GameDay was in town for a road test against the Mississippi State Bulldogs. In their weekly "Saturday Selections" segment, David Pollack, Desmond Howard, Lee Corso, and special guest picker Jonathan Papelbon all picked Mississippi State.  Kirk Herbstreit picked Auburn and moderator Chris Fowler did not pick.  Two turnovers on the first 2 offensive plays of the game for AU were costly for Auburn as Mississippi State scored 14 points off the turnovers. Mississippi State had four turnovers in the game which led to 13 points for Auburn. The game-changing play was when Ricardo Louis fumbled on a kickoff return leading to a Mississippi State touchdown. The Tigers now lead the all-time series 61–25–2.

South Carolina

In a game that proved to be a harder challenge than many expected, South Carolina took Auburn down to the wire before the Tiger defense stepped up at the end. An offensive battle took place as neither defense could stop the opposing offense. Each team only punted once during the game and when South Carolina punted Quan Bray fumbled on the return and the ball was recovered by South Carolina. That was the Tigers' only turnover of the game. South Carolina turned the ball over three times (all interceptions) including one inside the twenty yard line, and two in the end zone, which included one on the hail mary attempt as time expired. Cassanova McKinzy had one interception and Jonathan Jones had two interceptions. The Tigers had won a shootout 42-35. An interesting note is that Steve Spurrier "went for it" on 4th down several times, converting all of them except 1. The win was the sixth win of the season for Auburn, which meant they were bowl eligible. With the victory, Auburn's all-time record against South Carolina moved to 10-1-1.

Ole Miss

Auburn struck first after an incomplete pass (the official said Duke Williams bobbled it as he was going out of bounds) was reviewed and overturned. As a result of the review, the ball was placed at the 3-yard line. Nick Marshall then ran into the end zone for the touchdown. Ole Miss started with a punt on offense. Ole Miss struck next after a big run by Bo Wallace. Penalties cost Auburn greatly and they had a season high number of penalties. Nick Marshall also had a turnover in the red zone that also cost the Tigers greatly. Ole Miss was threatening to score with six and a half minutes to go, but Kris Frost knocked the ball out of Bo Wallace's hands resulting in a turnover for Auburn. Later, Auburn recovered a fumble in the end zone after it was ruled a touchdown, but review gave Auburn the ball. At the very end, Auburn came up with one last stop as time expired giving Auburn a 35-31 win. With the win, Auburn is now 29-10 all-time against Ole Miss.

Texas A&M

Auburn allowed a Texas A&M touchdown early putting the Tigers down 7-0. On the Tigers' first offensive possession, Cameron Artis-Payne fumbled the ball and it was recovered by Texas A&M leading to another Aggies score. Cameron Artis-Payne scored twice in the first quarter making the score 14-14 at the end of the first quarter. Auburn could only muster up a field goal in the second quarter while the defense allowed two A&M touchdowns. On the final play of the second quarter, a Daniel Carlson field goal attempt was blocked and returned for a touchdown making the halftime score Texas A&M 35, Auburn 17. Auburn started to come back in the third quarter, holding A&M to a field goal and scoring a touchdown. On the first play of the fourth quarter, Auburn scored again making the score 38-31 Texas A&M with plenty of time to play. Auburn allowed an A&M field goal, but scored quickly reducing the deficit to three points. With Auburn near the goal line and with less than two minutes remaining, Auburn's Nick Marshall fumbled the ball, and Texas A&M recovered. Auburn's defense then forced a three-and-out with only a little over a minute to play. A field goal would have tied it and a touchdown would have given the Tigers the lead, but a botched snap was recovered by Texas A&M. The Aggies then ran out the clock to upset Auburn 41-38. A&M now leads the series 4-1 all-time.

Georgia

The Tigers struck first on the very first possession of the game, but were shut out for the rest of the game. Penalties, turnovers, man defense in the secondary, an all-in quarterback spy, and the inability to stop Georgia's offense contributed to a 34-7 loss. The series is now tied 55-55-8. This game marked the end of Todd Gurley's suspension.

Samford

After a scoreless first quarter, Samford scored first in the second quarter. However, Auburn scored 31 unanswered en route to an easy 31-7 win on Senior Night. Samford coach Pat Sullivan played at Auburn, and was the Tigers' first Heisman Trophy winner. Auburn now leads the series 27-0-1. Auburn kept star receivers Duke Williams and Ricardo Louis out of the game so they could nurse injuries before the Iron Bowl rivalry game against Alabama.

Alabama

In the twelfth and final game of the regular season, Auburn traveled to Tuscaloosa to face their arch-rival Alabama. Alabama now leads the overall series 43–35–1. College GameDay was in Tuscaloosa for this game, making it the second time the traveling show was live from the location of an Auburn game this season (October 11 vs. Mississippi State). Every analyst picked Alabama to win. On the first play from scrimmage, Auburn turned the ball over on a failed lateral from Nick Marshall to Roc Thomas and Alabama scored on the drive after the fumble. Alabama scored again after Auburn got to the three yard line, but had to settle for a field goal. Auburn then scored ten unanswered points before the defense allowed a late Alabama drive for a touchdown on 4th and goal. Auburn then scored ten more unanswered points after the touchdown and after a Blake Sims interception. The halftime score was Auburn 26 and Alabama 20.

At the beginning of the fourth quarter, Alabama scored a touchdown and completed a two-point conversion to take the lead at 42-36. Auburn regained possession of the ball, but Nick Marshall was unable to make a 3rd-down conversion and the ball was punted back to Alabama. The Auburn defense was unable to prevent Alabama from rapidly progressing downfield and scoring with a touchdown pass to DeAndrew White. This made the score 48-36 Alabama. Saban opted to attempt another 2-point conversion to widen the gap, but this failed when Blake Sims was pushed out of bounds.

Upon repossession of the ball, Auburn successfully completed passes downfield but was unable to make a first down. Alabama regained the ball.

Wisconsin

On December 7, it was announced that #19 Auburn and #18 Wisconsin would meet in the Outback Bowl.  Auburn fired defensive coordinator Ellis Johnson prior to this game and it was announced that Charlie Harbison would be the interim defensive coordinator for this game. Wisconsin's coach Gary Andersen left for Oregon State so the Badgers' athletic director Barry Alvarez will coach the Badgers in this game. The all-time series is tied 1-1-1 and Wisconsin won the last meeting 28–14 in the 2006 Capital One Bowl. With the win, Wisconsin takes the series lead 2-1-1.

Rankings

2015 NFL Draft

Undrafted free agents

References

Auburn
Auburn Tigers football seasons
Auburn Tigers football